The Sacred Cod Trophy was awarded to each season's winner of the American college football series between the teams of Boston University (Boston University Terriers), Boston College (Boston College Eagles), and College of the Holy Cross (Holy Cross Crusaders).

The Boston University-Boston College game was normally played in early to mid November, the Boston University-Holy Cross game normally played in mid October, and the Boston College–Holy Cross game played as the last game of the season.

At the end of the series, the Boston College Eagles holds the most trophy victories with 3, the Holy Cross Crusaders have won 2, and the teams have shared the trophy on 3 occasions.

History of the trophy 
The Sacred Cod Trophy was the idea of the Boston University chapter of the Delta Sigma Pi fraternity. The trophy was first awarded in the 1954 season to Boston College. Boston College would dominate the BU-BC game during this span winning 8 of 9 games with Boston University's sole victory coming in 1959. Holy Cross would also dominate the BU-Holy Cross game winning 6 of 8. As a result, the BC-Holy Cross game would most often determine who wins the trophy. In 1962, the BU-Holy Cross game was not played due to the failure to find an available date, thus the trophy was not awarded. The series would end in 1963 when Boston College and Boston University decided to no longer schedule each other. The 1963 game would be postponed due to the death of John F. Kennedy and would never be re-scheduled.

The trophy 
The trophy was a gold cup topped with a cod fish a symbol of the Commonwealth of Massachusetts. The name was inspired by the Sacred Cod, a wooden fish that has hung in the Massachusetts State House since the mid 1700s.

Game results and trophy winners

See also 
 Green Line Rivalry
 Boston College–Holy Cross football rivalry
 Boston University–Holy Cross rivalry

References 

College football rivalries in the United States
Boston College Eagles football
Holy Cross Crusaders football
Boston University Terriers football